Combe Gibbet is a gibbet at the top of Gallows Down, near the village and just within the civil parish of Combe in Berkshire (formerly Hampshire).

Location
The nearest sizeable town is Newbury in Berkshire. It is built on top of a long barrow known as the Inkpen long barrow. The long barrow is 60 m long and 22 m wide, and is a Scheduled Monument. Walbury Hill (the highest point in South East England) is just a little further to the east.

History
It was erected in 1676 for the purpose of gibbeting the bodies of George Broomham and Dorothy Newman and has only ever been used for them. The gibbet was placed in such a prominent location as a warning, to deter others from committing crimes.

Broomham and Newman were having an affair and were hanged for murdering Broomham's wife Martha, and their son Robert after they discovered them together on the downs. Unfortunately for the lovers, the murder was witnessed by "Mad Thomas", who managed to convey what he had seen to the authorities. The pair were hanged in Winchester before being gibbeted at Combe.

After the 1676 gibbet rotted, a total of 7 replica gibbets have stood in its place, the most recent having been erected in 1992.

Tourism and leisure
Nowadays it is a popular local tourist attraction with good views of the surrounding area. It is also popular with hang gliders and paragliders. The hill is frequently used by the Thames Valley Hang Gliding and Paragliding Club.

The race, which is typically in late March / early April of each year, is one of the few true off-road point to point running races in the UK, coaches taking competitors to the start.

The "Combe Gibbet" Race takes in the highest hill in the South East of England, Walbury Hill; the highest in Hampshire, Pilot Hill; as well as Ladle Hill and the edge of Watership Down before entering Overton the source of the River Test.

References

Further reading
 Mysterious Britain
 Overton Harriers and Athletics Club
 Thames Valley Hang Gliding Club

1676 establishments in England
Hills of Berkshire
History of Berkshire
History of Hampshire
Tourist attractions in Berkshire